Sicyopterus squamosissimus is a species of goby that is from the islands of Sumatra and Java in Indonesia.  This species can reach a length of  SL.

References

squamosissimus
Freshwater fish of Indonesia
Taxa named by Philippe Keith
Taxa named by Clara Lord
Taxa named by Frédéric Busson
Taxa named by Sopian Sauri
Taxa named by Nicolas Hubert
Taxa named by Renny Kurnia Hadiaty
Fish described in 2015